The 3rd Guldbagge Awards ceremony, presented by the Swedish Film Institute, honored the best Swedish 1965 and 1966, and took place on 17 October 1966. Heja Roland! directed by Bo Widerberg was presented with the award for Best Film.

Awards
 Best Film: Heja Roland! by Bo Widerberg
 Best Director: Alf Sjöberg for Ön
 Best Actor: Thommy Berggren for Heja Roland!
 Best Actress: Christina Schollin for Ormen
 Special Achievement: Bengt Idestam-Almquist

References

External links
Official website
Guldbaggen on Facebook
Guldbaggen on Twitter
3rd Guldbagge Awards at Internet Movie Database

1966 in Sweden
1966 film awards
1960s in Stockholm
Guldbagge Awards ceremonies
October 1966 events in Europe